Stephen Thomas Knight MA (Oxon.), PhD (Sydney), F.A.H.A., F.E.A. (born 21 September 1940) was, until September 2011, a distinguished research professor in English literature at Cardiff University; and is a professorial fellow of Literature at the University of Melbourne. His areas of expertise include medieval English and European literature, Robin Hood, Merlin, cultural studies, crime fiction, and Australian matters. He has authored over thirty books, and is well known in the public sphere for his contribution to a range of fields. His most recent books have been The Politics of Myth (2015), Towards Sherlock Holmes: A Thematic History of Crime Fiction in the 19th Century World (2017), Australian Crime Fiction: A 200-year History (2018), The Fiction of G.W.M. Reynolds: The Man Who Outsold Dickens (2019) and The University is Closed for Open Day: Themes and Scenes from 21st Century Australia (2019).

Biography 
Knight was educated at Bournemouth Grammar School and at Jesus College, Oxford. He graduated in 1962 and was appointed to the University of Sydney in 1963. In 1968–69 he was lecturer in English at the Australian National University, and he returned to the University of Sydney in 1970, where he was senior lecturer and associate professor. In 1986 he was appointed Robert Wallace Professor of English at the University of Melbourne. and in 1992 returned to Britain to the first chair of English at the new De Montfort University in Leicester. In 1994, he moved to a position at Cardiff University as professor and head of English; he was also head of the School of English, Philosophy and Communication, and from 2006 was appointed distinguished research professor. Knight is a Fellow of the Australian Academy of the Humanities, a Fellow of the English Association, and a Cyfaill y Celtiaid, or "Fellow of the Celts".

Much of Knight's scholarly writings have been in the areas of medieval English literature, Robin Hood, Merlin and the Arthurian myth. His long-standing interest in crime fiction generated the study Form and Ideology in Crime Fiction (1980), and several other books and essay-collections, including Continent of Mystery: A Thematic History of Australian Crime Fiction (1997), for which he was awarded the Ned Kelly Lifetime Achievement Award. He has also written sociocultural commentaries, notably The Selling of the Australian Mind (1990), Freedom Was Compulsory (1994), and a new set of socio-critical Australian essays The University is Closed for Open Day (2019).

Major works

Robin Hood: A Mythic Biography 
This book, which won the 2005 International Mythopoeic Society Award for Non-Fiction, traces the origins of the myth, providing insights into why Robin Hood is still such an essential and evolving figure in culture and literature. Knight presents the detailed elements and contexts of the Robin Hood myth, as he explores its changing representations and conceptions.

The Robin Hood myth has a life of its own, Knight says "To study Robin Hood," as Knight explains, "is to study over five hundred years of the development of modern concepts of heroism, art, politics, and the self. It is an exciting and enthralling domain of study, that can in itself become a guide to the changing patterns and dynamics of society and culture over an enormous period."

A Hundred Years of Fiction: Writing Wales in English 
After becoming Professor and Head of English at Cardiff University, Wales, Knight introduced the department's first courses in Welsh fiction in English and then produced in 2004 the first book written on this topic, which began a series on the topic from the University of Wales Press. Exploring the fiction and the context of his own South Welsh family, its first section explored the slow growth of English-language Welsh fiction in the nineteenth century, then devoted a full section to the major development of novels and stories about 'The Industrial Settlement', well into the twentieth century. The third section deals with 'Integration and Independence', charting how since the mid-twentieth century writers in English have grown increasingly familiar with, even close to, the Welsh-language culture of the country, and how in the later twentieth century, as Wales became increasing independent, its writers, notably Emyr Humphreys and Chris Meredith, both Welsh speakers, wrote in English fiction inherently for the country as a whole

Merlin: Knowledge and Power Through the Ages 
This book traces the myth of Merlin back to its earliest roots in the early Welsh figure of Myrddin and he then follows Merlin as he is re-imagined through centuries of literature and art, beginning with Geoffrey of Monmouth, whose immensely popular Latin History of the Kings of Britain (c. 1136) transmitted the story of Merlin to Europe at large. The book covers French and German as well as Anglophone elements of the myth and brings the story up to the present with discussions of a globalised Merlin who finds his way into popular literature, film, television, and New Age philosophy. In tracing the applied meanings of knowledge in a range of social contexts, Knight reveals the four main stages of the Merlin myth: Wisdom (early Celtic British), Advice (medieval European), Cleverness (early modern English), and Education (worldwide since the nineteenth century).

The book argues that Merlin in all his guises represents a conflict basic to Western societies-the clash between knowledge and power. While the Merlin story varies over time, the underlying structural tension remains the same whether it takes the form of bard versus lord, vizier versus monarch, scientist versus capitalist, or academic versus politician: Merlin embodies the contentious duality inherent to organized societies.

The Mysteries of the Cities: Urban Crime Fiction in the Nineteenth Century 
This study describes the lengthy popular fictions that responded to the new, exciting and alarming experience of city life in the mid nineteenth century. Starting with Eugène Sue's Les Mystères de Paris (1842-3) it shows how young authors, working for newspapers and street level publishers, did not use the new power of detectives or the old patterns of aristocratic and moral control, and simply realised the multiple, overlapping, chaotic and often violent stories of modern urban crime. The mode was picked up by George W. M. Reynolds in The Mysteries of London (1844-8), and was also imitated in multiple American versions, of which the most impressive are George Lippard's The Quaker City, or The Monks of Monk Hall (1845), about Philadelphia, and The Mysteries of New York (1848) by E. C. Z. Judson (better known as 'Ned Buntline')..

The Mysteries genre spread around the world – including to Berlin, St Petersburg, Milan, and many American urban centres: the last true realisation was in gold-rich Melbourne in 1873, when Donald Cameron produced The Mysteries of Melbourne Life.

Knight shows how this material expresses and examines the drama of new megalopolitan life, how it influenced authors who sometimes claimed not to admire it such as Victor Hugo, Charles Dickens and Émile Zola, and how this genre is a massively overlooked storehouse of story, melodrama and above all urban emotional history.

The Politics of Myth: Social Meanings from King Arthur to Ned Kelly 
This book challenges the idea that myths are just quaint fables from the past that function to entertain and distract people from modern anxieties. It argues major myths represent a set of forces and challenges that remain relevant across time and are reworked and reinterpreted to focus concerns in changing periods and new social contexts. Studying major myths that have remained alive in world culture (all the figures discussed have been in film and television in the 21st century) it shows three major areas of debate through myth, namely Power, Resistance and Knowledge.

The mythical figures in these domains cross social boundaries – kings and queens like Arthur, Guinevere and Elizabeth I are analysed, and so are mythic celebrities of humble origin like Jeanne d’Arc, Ned Kelly and Robin Hood. As those names indicate, reality and myth interweave. The actuality of another figure discussed here, Shakespeare, has been often challenged, and people still write letters to the genuinely mythic Sherlock Holmes. While some insist Robin Hood must have existed, the only good candidate for ancient reality is that most mysterious man of knowledge, Merlin. Myths are indeed mythic.

Towards Sherlock Holmes: A Thematic History of Crime Fiction in the 19th Century World. 
This study goes into much more detail on nineteenth-century crime fiction than Knight's earlier work on this material, which was more summary-oriented than theme-focused. The purpose here is to use close research to explore the issues and socio-cultural domains that are dealt with in the crime fiction that led to – and continued through—the dominating myth of Sherlock Holmes. The first two chapters go outside England to explore the traditions of American crime fiction in the century and then, under the title 'Sherlock Holmes' Grandmother' (who was from France), the richly suggestive French contributions to the genre.

These are followed by socially-focused chapters, the first dealing with class in English crime fiction of the nineteenth century, and the next on the role of women detectives in that period. This is followed by a study of crime fiction elements in the work of major novelists, Gaskell, Collins, Dickens, Braddon and Wood.

The next chapter studies in detail the often referenced but never properly analysed first true best-seller of the genre, Fergus Hume's Melbourne-based The Mystery of a Hansom Cab; the last chapter deals in a thematic way with the element of imperialism, and also anti-imperialism, in the fiction of Conan Doyle – not only his Sherlock Holmes stories.

Australian Crime Fiction: A 200-Year History
In 1997 Knight published Continent of Mystery: A Thematic History of Australian Crime Fiction, a study of the genre up to 1995 which focused on separate themes, with chapters on Origins, Women, Police, Place, and Colonial/Post-Colonial. The new book differs by being a formal history of the genre, with much wider reference to authors and their contexts; it also discusses the many authors who have emerged since 1995 in the new flourishing of the genre in Australia.

Section 1 deals with the first century, 1818–1914, and Section 2 with the period 1915–45, after the dominance of English publishers was somewhat disrupted during war time. Section 3, covering 1946–1979, shows the notable development of women authors and the psychothriller, while Section 4 accounts for the important period 1980-99 when, with English publishers largely withdrawing from the field, a vigorous new range of Australian authors developed the private-eye model (both male and female), and the nationally popular and essentially pro-criminal crime novel, as well as the psychothriller, coming largely from women authors.

Section 5, dealing only with 2000 to 2017, nevertheless describes the largest number of authors and novels of any section, and shows how police detectives, for long nationally unpopular, finally become, in both genders, a major element in what is now a widely recognised, socially explorative and strong-selling genre.

G.W.M. Reynolds and His Fiction: The Man Who Outsold Dickens 
Having published in The Mysteries of the Cities (2012) a chapter on George Reynolds' The Mysteries of London (1844–48), Knight grew increasingly interested in this hugely popular author of thirty-six novels, several of them multi-volume, and over twenty million words of fiction in all. Reynolds has been almost completely ignored by English literary criticism, in part because of his popular status, but also because of his politics: he was a Chartist and general supporter of the lower social orders, especially seeking their improved education. Much disliked by Dickens, largely for his radicalism, he in return called Dickens an 'aristocratic lickspittle'. Literary criticism has evidently shared hostility to his politics and popular orientation and he has hardly ever been discussed or even mentioned in critical surveys. There have in recent years been some essays written on him, but this book, surveying and analysing all of Reynolds novels and novellas, is the first written on this remarkably overlooked and decidedly important author.

Media 
Knight has appeared in the media many times, producing reviews for newspapers, magazines and radio, including for ten years from the mid-1970s a monthly column in The Sydney Morning Herald on crime fiction. He has also written radio reviews and features and has appeared on Melvyn Bragg's BBC Radio 4 programme In Our Time, discussing Robin Hood, Merlin, and the legend of the Fisher King, as well as on the 2006 BBC television production World of Robin Hood, with Jonathan Ross. He has done a range of interviews on The Politics of Myth (2015).

He received media attention across the world in 1999 through his commentary in London's The Sunday Times relating to gender roles in the Robin Hood legend, which some elements of the media took to be evidence that Robin Hood was gay.

Bibliography

Select bibliography 
Knight, Stephen (1972) Rymyng Craftily: Meaning in Chaucer’s Poetry. Sydney : Angus and Robertson.
Knight, Stephen (1973) The Poetry of the Canterbury Tales. Sydney : Angus and Robertson.
Knight, Stephen (1980) Form and Ideology in Crime Fiction. London : Macmillan.
Knight, Stephen (1983) Arthurian Literature and Society. London : Macmillan.
Knight, Stephen (1986) Geoffrey Chaucer. Oxford : Blackwell.
Knight, Stephen (1990) The Selling of the Australian Mind: From First Fleet to Third Mercedes. Melbourne : Heinemann.
Knight, Stephen (1994) Robin Hood: A Complete Study of the English Outlaw. Oxford : Blackwell.
Knight, Stephen (1994) Freedom Was Compulsory. Melbourne : Minerva.
Knight, Stephen (1997) Continent of Mystery: A Thematic History of Australian Crime Fiction. Melbourne : Melbourne University Press.
Knight, Stephen (Ed) (1998) Robin Hood: The Forresters Manuscript. Cambridge : Brewer.
Knight, Stephen & Gustav Klaus (Eds) (2000) British Industrial Fictions. Cardiff : University of Wales Press.
Knight, Stephen (2003) Robin Hood: A Mythic Biography. Ithaca and London : Cornell University Press.
Knight, Stephen (2004) A Hundred Years of Fiction: Writing Wales in English. Cardiff : University of Wales Press.
Knight, Stephen (2004) Crime Fiction, 1800–2000: Detection, Death, Diversity. London : Palgrave Macmillan.
Knight, Stephen (2009) Merlin: Knowledge and Power Through the Ages. Ithaca : Cornell University Press.
Knight, Stephen (2012) The Mysteries of the Cities: Urban Crime Fiction in the Nineteenth Century. Jefferson NC :  McFarland.
Knight, Stephen (Ed) (2012) Robin Hood in Greenwood Stood: Alterity and Context in the English Outlaw Myth. Turnhout : Brepols.
Knight, Stephen (2014) Secrets of Crime Fiction Classics: Detecting the Delights of 21 Enduring Stories. Jefferson, NC : McFarland.
Knight, Stephen & Maurizio Ascari (Eds) (2015) Romantic Sublime to Detective Crime. Monaco : LiberFaber.
Knight, Stephen (2015) Reading Robin Hood: Content, Form and Reception in the Outlaw Myth. Manchester : Manchester University Press.
Knight, Stephen (2015) The Politics of Myth: Social Meanings from King Arthur to Ned Kelly. Melbourne : Melbourne University Press.
Knight, Stephen (2017) Towards Sherlock Holmes: A Thematic History of Crime Fiction in the 19th Century World. Jefferson, NC: McFarland.
Knight, Stephen (2018) Australian Crime Fiction: A 200-Year History. Jefferson, NC: McFarland.
Knight, Stephen (2019) G.W.M. Reynolds and His Fiction: The Man Who Outsold Dickens. New York and London: Routledge. 
Knight, Stephen (2019) The University is Closed for Open Day: Themes and Scenes from 21st Century Australia. Melbourne: Melbourne University Press.

Related works 
Evans, Fulton & Matthews (Eds.) (2006) Medieval Cultural Studies: Essays in Honour of Stephen Knight. Cardiff :  University of Wales Press.

Notes and references

Living people
1940 births
Alumni of Jesus College, Oxford
Academic staff of the University of Sydney
Academic staff of the Australian National University
Academic staff of the University of Melbourne
Academics of De Montfort University
Academics of Cardiff University
Ned Kelly Award winners
Arthurian scholars
English literature academics